Soutr Nikom District (Sout ~ / ~ Nikum) is a district of Siem Reap Province, in north western Cambodia. According to the 1998 census of Cambodia, it had a population of 90,080.

Administrative divisions
Soutr Nikom District has 10 communes and 113 villages.

References 

Districts of Cambodia
Geography of Siem Reap province